Arthur McDougall, nicknamed "Rabbit", was an American Negro league shortstop in 1909 and 1910.

McDougall played for the St. Paul Colored Gophers in 1909 and 1910. In six recorded games, he posted three hits in 26 plate appearances.

References

External links
 and Seamheads

Year of birth missing
Year of death missing
Place of birth missing
Place of death missing
St. Paul Colored Gophers players
Baseball shortstops